A reverse mortgage is a mortgage loan, usually secured by a residential property, that enables the borrower to access the unencumbered value of the property. The loans are typically promoted to older homeowners and typically do not require monthly mortgage payments. Borrowers are still responsible for property taxes or homeowner's insurance. Reverse mortgages allow older people to immediately access the home equity they have built up in their homes, and defer payment of the loan until they die, sell, or move out of the home. Because there are no required mortgage payments on a reverse mortgage, the interest is added to the loan balance each month. The rising loan balance can eventually grow to exceed the value of the home, particularly in times of declining home values or if the borrower continues to live in the home for many years. However, the borrower (or the borrower's estate) is generally not required to repay any additional loan balance in excess of the value of the home.

Regulators and academics have given mixed commentary on the reverse mortgage market. Some economists argue that reverse mortgages may benefit the elderly by smoothing out their income and consumption patterns over time. However, regulatory authorities, such as the Consumer Financial Protection Bureau, argue that reverse mortgages are "complex products and difficult for consumers to understand", especially in light of "misleading advertising", low-quality counseling, and "risk of fraud and other scams". Moreover, the Bureau claims that many consumers do not use reverse mortgages for the positive, consumption-smoothing purposes advanced by economists. In Canada, the borrower must seek independent legal advice before being approved for a reverse mortgage. In 2014, a "relatively high number" of the U.S. reverse mortgage borrowers – about 12% – defaulted on "their property taxes or homeowners insurance". In the United States, reverse mortgage borrowers can face foreclosure if they do not maintain their homes or keep up to date on homeowner's insurance and property taxes.

By country

Australia

Eligibility 
Reverse mortgages are available in Australia. Under the Responsible Lending Laws, the National Consumer Credit Protection Act was amended in 2012 to incorporate a high level of regulation for reverse mortgage. Reverse mortgages are also regulated by the Australian Securities and Investments Commission (ASIC) requiring high compliance and disclosure from lenders and advisers to all borrowers.

Borrowers should seek credit advice from an accredited reverse mortgage specialist before applying for a reverse mortgage. Anyone who wants to engage in credit activities (including lenders, lessors and brokers) must be licensed with ASIC or be a representative of someone who is licensed (that is, they must either have their own licence or come under the umbrella of another licensee as an authorised credit representative or employee) (ASIC)

Eligibility requirements vary by lender. To qualify for a reverse mortgage in Australia,
 the borrower must be over a certain age, usually 60 or 65 years of age; if the mortgage has more than one borrower, the youngest borrower must meet the age requirement
 the borrower must own the property, or the existing mortgage balance must be low enough that it will be extinguished by the reverse mortgage proceeds, thus leaving the reverse mortgage as the only debt that remains secured against the property.

Loan size and cost 
Reverse mortgages in Australia can be as high as 50% of the property's value. The exact amount of money available (loan size) is determined by several factors:
 the borrower's age, with a higher amount available at a higher age
 current interest rates
 property value
 the property's location
 program minimum and maximum; for example, the loan might be constrained to a minimum of $10,000 and a maximum of between $250,000 and $1,000,000 depending on the lender.
The cost of getting a reverse mortgage depends on the particular reverse mortgage program the borrower acquires.  These costs are frequently rolled into the loan itself and therefore compound with the principal. Typical costs for the reverse mortgage include:
 an application fee (establishment fee) = between $0 and $950
 stamp duty, mortgage registration fees, and other government charges = vary with location

The interest rate on the reverse mortgage varies. Some programs used to offer fixed rate loans, while others offer variable rate loans. Since the update of the National Consumer Credit Protection Act in September 2012 new reverse mortgage loans are not allowed to have fixed rates. Only reverse mortgage loans written before that date can have a fixed interest rates

In addition, there may be costs during the life of the reverse mortgage. A monthly service charge may be applied to the balance of the loan (for example, $12 per month), which then compounds with the principal. The best products have zero monthly fees.

Proceeds from a reverse mortgage 
The money from a reverse mortgage can be distributed in several different ways:
 as a lump sum, in cash, at settlement;
 as a Tenure payment, a monthly cash payment;
 as a line of credit, similar to a home equity line of credit;
 as a combination of these.
The most common reasons why people release home equity through a reverse mortgage are:
 to receive additional income to help with regular living costs;
 consolidate and pay other debts—e.g., refinance a normal or "forward" mortgage that is still in place when retiring or to use the available cash to pay installment or revolving debt.
 buy a new car;
 fund aged care—in home or in a residential aged-care facility (nursing home);
 upgrade or repair or renovate the home;
 help the family or grandchildren—this has to be done carefully or Centrelink pensions may be affected under the "gifting" provisions of Centrelink;
 pay for a vacation.

Taxes and insurance 
The borrower remains entirely responsible for the property. This includes physical maintenance. In addition, some programs require periodic reassessments of the value of the property.

Income from a reverse mortgage set up as an annuity or as a line of credit should not affect Government Income Support entitlements. However, income from a reverse mortgage set up as a lump sum could be considered a financial investment and thus deemed under the Income Test; this category includes all sums over $40,000 and sums under $40,000 that are not spent within 90 days.

When the loan comes due 
Most reverse mortgages must be repaid (including all unpaid interest and fees) when they leave the home permanently. This includes when they sell the home or die. However, most reverse mortgages are owner-occupier loans only so that the borrower is not allowed to rent the property to a long-term tenant and move out. A borrower should check this if he thinks he wants to rent his property and move somewhere else.

A common misconception is that when the borrower dies or leaves the home (e.g., goes to an aged-care facility or moves somewhere else) the house must be sold. This is not the case; the loan must be repaid. Thus, the beneficiaries of the estate may decide to repay the reverse mortgage from other sources, sale of other assets, or even refinancing to a normal mortgage or, if they qualify, another reverse mortgage.

Prepayment of the loan—when the borrower pays the loan back before it reaches term—may incur penalties, depending on the loan. An additional fee could also be imposed in the event of a redraw. Under the National Credit Code, penalties for early repayment are illegal on new loans since September 2012; however, a bank may charge a reasonable administration fee for preparation of the discharge of mortgage.

All reverse mortgages written since September 2012 must have a "No Negative Equity Guarantee". This means that if the balance of the loan exceeds the proceeds of sale of the property, no claim for this excess will be made against the estate or other beneficiaries of the borrower."

On 18 September 2012, the government introduced statutory 'negative equity protection' on all new reverse mortgage contracts. This means you cannot end up owing the lender more than your home is worth (the market value or equity). If you entered into a reverse mortgage before 18 September 2012, check your contract to see if you are protected in circumstances under which your loan balance ends up being more than the value of your property.

When the reverse mortgage contract ends and the borrower's home is sold, the lender will receive the proceeds of the sale and the borrower cannot be held liable for any debt in excess of this (except in certain circumstances, such as fraud or misrepresentation). Where the property sells for more than the amount owed to the lender, the borrower or his estate will receive the extra funds.

Canada 
According to the October 2018 filings of the  Office of the Superintendent of Financial Institutions (OSFI), an independent federal agency reporting to the Minister of Finance in that month, the outstanding reverse mortgage debt for Canadians soared to $CDN3.42 billion, setting a new record for both the monthly and the annual increases. Daniel Wong at Better Dwelling wrote that, the jump represented an 11.57% increase from September, which is the second biggest increase since 2010, 844% more than the median monthly pace of growth. The annual increase of 57.46% is 274% larger than the median annualized pace of growth.

Reverse mortgages in Canada are available through three financial institutions - Home Equity Bank, Equitable Bank and Bloom Financial.  No reverse mortgages issued in Canada are insured by the government due to the nature of the product. 

The cost of getting a reverse mortgage from a private sector lender may exceed the costs of other types of mortgage or equity conversion loans. Exact costs depend on the particular reverse mortgage program the borrower acquires and vary from lender to lender. Depending on the program, there may be other costs.

Money received in a reverse mortgage is still considered a loan and therefore is not taxable income. It therefore does not affect government benefits from Old Age Security (OAS) or Guaranteed Income Supplement (GIS).

The reverse mortgage comes due—the loan plus interest must be repaid—when the borrower dies, sells the property, or moves out of the house. Depending on the program, the reverse mortgage may be transferable to a different property if the owner moves. Prepayment of the loan—when the borrower pays the loan back before it reaches term—may incur penalties, depending on the program.

United States 
The FHA-insured Home Equity Conversion Mortgage, or HECM, was signed into law on February 5, 1988, by President Ronald Reagan as part of the Housing and Community Development Act of 1987. The first HECM was given to Marjorie Mason of Fairway, Kansas, in 1989 by James B. Nutter and Company.

In the United States, the FHA-insured HECM (home equity conversion mortgage) aka reverse mortgage, is a non-recourse loan. In simple terms, the borrowers are not responsible to repay any loan balance that exceeds the net-sales proceeds of their home. For example, if the last borrower left the home and the loan balance on their FHA-insured reverse mortgage was $125,000, and the home sold for $100,000, neither the borrower nor their heirs would be responsible for the $25,000 on the reverse mortgage loan that exceeded the value of their home. The extra $25,000 would be paid from the FHA insurance that was purchased when the HECM loan was originated. A reverse mortgage cannot go upside down. The cost of the FHA mortgage insurance is a one-time fee of 2% of the appraised value of the home, and then an annual fee of 0.5% of the outstanding loan balance.

According to a 2015 article in the Journal of Urban Economics, in 2014, about 12% of the United States HECM reverse mortgage borrowers defaulted on "their property taxes or homeowners insurance"—a "relatively high default rate". In the United States, reverse mortgage borrowers can face foreclosure if they do not maintain their homes or keep up to date on homeowner's insurance and property taxes. The FBI, Inspector General, and HUD urge American consumers, especially senior citizens, to be cautious when considering reverse mortgages to avoid scams. HUD specifically warns consumers to "beware of scam artists that charge thousands of dollars for information that is free from HUD.

Eligibility
To qualify for the HECM reverse mortgage in the United States, borrowers generally must be at least 62 years of age and the home must be their primary residence (second homes and investment properties do not qualify).

On 25 April 2014, FHA revised the HECM age eligibility requirements to extend certain protections to spouses younger than age 62. Under the old guidelines, the reverse mortgage could only be written for the spouse who was 62 or older. If the older spouse died, the reverse mortgage balance became due and payable if the younger surviving spouse was left off of the HECM loan. If this younger spouse was unable to pay off or refinance the reverse mortgage balance, he or she was forced either to sell the home or lose it to foreclosure. This often created a significant hardship for spouses of deceased HECM mortgagors, so FHA revised the eligibility requirements in Mortgagee Letter 2014-07. Under the new guidelines, spouses who are younger than age 62 at the time of origination retain the protections offered by the HECM program if the older spouse who got the mortgage dies. This means that the surviving spouse can remain living in the home without having to repay the reverse mortgage balance as long as he or she keeps up with property taxes and homeowner's insurance and maintains the home to a reasonable level.

For a reverse mortgage to be a viable financial option, existing mortgage balances usually must be low enough to be paid off with the reverse mortgage proceeds.  However, borrowers do have the option of paying down their existing mortgage balance to qualify for a HECM reverse mortgage.

The HECM reverse mortgage follows the standard FHA eligibility requirements for property type, meaning most 1–4 family dwellings, FHA approved condominiums, and PUDs qualify. Manufactured homes also qualify as long as they meet FHA standards.

Before starting the loan process for an FHA/HUD-approved reverse mortgage, applicants must take an approved counseling course. An approved counselor should help explain how reverse mortgages work, the financial and tax implications of taking out a reverse mortgage, payment options, and costs associated with a reverse mortgage. The counseling is meant to protect borrowers, although the quality of counseling has been criticized by groups such as the Consumer Financial Protection Bureau.

In a 2010 survey of elderly Americans, 48% of respondents cited financial difficulties as the primary reason for obtaining a reverse mortgage and 81% stated a desire to remain in their current homes until death.

Financial assessment 
On March 2, 2015, FHA implemented new guidelines that require reverse mortgage applicants to undergo a financial assessment. Though HECM borrowers are not required to make monthly mortgage payments, FHA wants to make sure they have the financial ability and willingness to keep up with property taxes and homeowner's insurance (and any other applicable property charges). It has become apparent the actual reason for Financial Assessment (FA) is the FHA HECM is an "entitlement loan" similar in scope to Social Security. Prior to 2015, a Lender could not refuse a request for a HECM as the requirement is age 62+, own a home, and meet initial debt-to-equity requirements. With FA, the lender may now force Equity "set aside" rules and sums that make the loan impossible; the same as a declination letter for poor credit.

Financial assessment involves evaluating two main areas:
 Residual income - Borrowers must have a certain amount of residual income left over after covering monthly expenses. 
 Satisfactory credit - All housing and installment debt payments must have been made on time in the last 12 months; there are no more than two 30-day late mortgage or installment payments in the previous 24 months, and there is no major derogatory credit on revolving accounts in the last 12 months.
If residual income or credit does not meet FHA guidelines, the lender can possibly make up for it by documenting extenuating circumstances that led to the financial hardship. If no extenuating circumstances can be documented, the borrower may not qualify at all or the lender may require a large amount of the principal limit (if available) to be carved out into a Life Expectancy Set Aside (LESA) for the payment of property charges (property taxes, homeowners insurance, etc.).

Interest rates 
The HECM reverse mortgage offers fixed and adjustable interest rates. The fixed-rate program comes with the security of an interest rate that does not change for the life of the reverse mortgage, but the interest rate is usually higher at the start of the loan than a comparable adjustable-rate HECM. Adjustable-rate reverse mortgages typically have interest rates that can change on a monthly or yearly basis within certain limits.

Applicants for a HECM reverse mortgage will likely notice that there are two different interest rates disclosed on their loan documents: the initial interest rate, or IIR, and the expected interest rate, or EIR.

Initial interest rate (IIR) 
The initial interest rate, or IIR, is the actual note rate at which interest accrues on the outstanding loan balance on an annual basis. For fixed-rate reverse mortgages, the IIR can never change. For adjustable-rate reverse mortgages, the IIR can change with program limits up to a lifetime interest rate cap.

Expected interest rate (EIR) 
The expected interest rate, or EIR, is used mainly for calculation purposes to determine how much a reverse mortgage borrower qualifies for based on the value of the home (up to the maximum lending limit of $726,525) and age of the youngest borrower. The EIR is often different from the actual note rate, or IIR. The EIR does not determine the amount of interest that accrues on the loan balance (the IIR does that).

Amount of proceeds available 
The total pool of money that a borrower can receive from a HECM reverse mortgage is called the principal limit (PL), which is calculated based on the maximum claim amount (MCA), the age of the youngest borrower, the expected interest rate (EIR), and a table to PL factors published by HUD. Similar to loan-to-value (LTV) in the forward mortgage world, the principal limit is essentially the percentage of the value of the home that can be lent under the FHA HECM guidelines. Most PLs are typically in the range of 50% to 60% of the MCA, but they can sometimes be higher or lower. The table below gives examples of principal limits for various ages and EIRs and a property value of $250,000.   

The principal limit tends to increase with age and decrease as the EIR rises. In other words, older borrowers tend to qualify for more money than younger borrowers, but the total amount of money available under the HECM program tends to decrease for all ages as interest rates rise.

Closing costs, existing mortgage balances, other liens, and any property taxes or homeowners insurance due are typically paid out of the initial principal limit. Any additional proceeds available can be distributed to the borrower in several ways, which will be detailed next.

Options for distribution of proceeds 
The money from a reverse mortgage can be distributed in four ways, based on the borrower's financial needs and goals:
 Lump sum in cash at settlement 
 Monthly payment (loan advance) for a set number of years (term) or life (tenure)
 Line of credit (similar to a home equity line of credit)
 Some combination of the above
Note that the adjustable-rate HECM offers all of the above payment options, but the fixed-rate HECM only offers lump sum.

The line of credit option accrues growth, meaning that whatever is available and unused on the line of credit will automatically grow larger at a compounding rate. This means that borrowers who opt for a HECM line of credit can potentially gain access to more cash over time than what they initially qualified for at origination.

The line of credit growth rate is determined by adding 1.25% to the initial interest rate (IIR), which means the line of credit will grow faster if the interest rate on the loan increases.

On 3 September 2013 HUD implemented Mortgagee Letter 2013-27, which made significant changes to the amount of proceeds that can be distributed within the first year of the loan. Because many borrowers were taking full draw lump sums (often at the encouragement of lenders) at closing and burning through the money quickly, HUD sought to protect borrowers and the viability of the HECM program by limiting the amount of proceeds that can be accessed within the first 12 months of the loan.

If the total mandatory obligations (which includes existing mortgage balances, all closing costs, delinquent federal debts, and purchase transaction costs) to be paid by the reverse mortgage are less than 60% of the principal limit, then the borrower can draw additional proceeds up to 60% of the principal limit in the first 12 months. Any remaining available proceeds can be accessed after 12 months.

If the total mandatory obligations exceed 60% of the principal limit, then the borrower can draw an additional 10% of the principal limit if available.

HECM for purchase
The Housing and Economic Recovery Act of 2008 provided HECM mortgagors with the opportunity to purchase a new principal residence with HECM loan proceeds — the so-called HECM for Purchase program, effective January 2009. The "HECM for Purchase" applies if "the borrower is able to pay the difference between the HECM and the sales price and closing costs for the property. The program was designed to allow the elderly to purchase a new principal residence and obtain a reverse mortgage within a single transaction by eliminating the need for a second closing. Texas was the last state to allow for reverse mortgages for purchase.

Closing costs
Reverse mortgages are frequently criticized over the issue of closing costs, which can sometimes be expensive. This opinion stems from the inclusion of the FHA Upfront Mortgage insurance which protects the BORROWER, and confusion regarding "Broker paid compensation" that is a customary part of the loan that has nothing to do with the Borrower's checkbook or equity balance. Considering the restrictions imposed upon HECM loans, they are comparable to their "Forward" contemporaries in overall costs. The following are the most typical closing costs paid at closing to obtain a reverse mortgage:
 Counseling fee: The first step to get a reverse mortgage is to go through a counseling session with a HUD-approved counselor. The average cost of the counseling session is usually around $125 and is imposed because HUD is concerned that the over-62 crowd cannot enter into transactions without being warned.
 Origination fee: This is charged by the lender to arrange the reverse mortgage. Origination fees can vary widely from lender to lender and can range from nothing to a maximum of $6,000. 
 Third-party fees: These fees are for third-party services hired to complete the reverse mortgage, such as appraisal, title insurance, escrow, government recording, tax stamps (where applicable), credit reports, etc. 
 Initial mortgage insurance premium (IMIP): This is a one-time cost paid at closing to FHA to insure the reverse mortgage and protect both lenders and borrowers. The IMIP protects lenders by making them whole if the home sells at the time of loan repayment for less than what is owed on the reverse mortgage. This protects borrowers as well because it means they will never owe more than their home is worth. As of 1/2019, the IMIP is now 2% of the max claim amount (Either the appraised value of the home up to a maximum of $726,535) The annual MIP (mortgage insurance premium) is .50% of the outstanding loan balance.  
The vast majority of closing costs typically can be rolled into the new loan amount (except in the case of HECM for purchase, where they're included in the down payment), so they don't need to be paid out of pocket by the borrower. The only exceptions to this rule may be the counseling fee, appraisal, and any repairs that may need to be done to the home to make it fully compliant with the FHA guidelines before completing the reverse mortgage.

Lenders disclose estimated closing costs using several standardized documents, including the Reverse Mortgage Comparison, Loan Amortization, Total Annual Loan Cost (TALC), Closing Cost Worksheet, and the Good Faith Estimate (GFE). These documents can be used to compare loan offers from different lenders.

Ongoing costs 
There are two ongoing costs that may apply to a reverse mortgage: annual mortgage insurance and servicing fees. The IMIP, (on time Initial Mortgage Insurance Premium) of 2% of the appraised value is charged at closing. The IMIP is the largest cost associated with an FHA HECM or Reverse Mortgage. This cost is typically added to the initial loan amount and does not need to be paid out of pocket. The annual mortgage insurance is charged by FHA to insure the loan and accrues annually at a rate of .50% of the loan balance. Annual mortgage insurance does not need to be paid out of pocket by the borrower; it can be allowed to accrue onto the loan balance over time.

Servicing fees are less common today than in the past, but some lenders may still charge them to cover the cost of servicing the reverse mortgage over time. Servicing fees, if charged, are usually around $30 per month and can be allowed to accrue onto the loan balance (they don't need to be paid out of pocket).

Taxes and insurance
Unlike traditional forward mortgages, there are no escrow accounts in the reverse mortgage world. Property taxes and homeowners insurance are paid by the homeowner on their own, which is a requirement of the HECM program (along with the payment of other property charges such as HOA dues).

Life expectancy set aside (LESA) 
If a reverse mortgage applicant fails to meet the satisfactory credit or residual income standards required under the new financial assessment guidelines implemented by FHA on March 2, 2015, the lender may require a Life Expectancy Set Aside, or LESA. A LESA carves out a portion of the reverse mortgage benefit amount for the payment of property taxes and insurance for the borrower's expected remaining life span. FHA implemented the LESA to reduce defaults based on the nonpayment of property taxes and insurance.

Are HECM proceeds taxable? 
The American Bar Association guide advises that generally,
 The Internal Revenue Service does not consider loan advances to be income.
 Annuity advances may be partially taxable.
 Interest charged is not deductible until it is actually paid, that is, at the end of the loan.
 The mortgage insurance premium is deductible on the 1040 long form.
 The money used from a Reverse Mortgage is not taxable. IRS For Senior Taxpayers

The money received from a reverse mortgage is considered a loan advance. It therefore is not taxable and does not directly affect Social Security or Medicare benefits. However, an American Bar Association guide to reverse mortgages explains that if borrowers receive Medicaid, SSI, or other public benefits, loan advances will be counted as "liquid assets" if the money is kept in an account (savings, checking, etc.) past the end of the calendar month in which it is received; the borrower could then lose eligibility for such public programs if total liquid assets (cash, generally) is then greater than those programs allow.

When the loan comes due 
The HECM reverse mortgage is not due and payable until the last borrower (or non-borrowing spouse) dies, sells the house, or fails to live in the home for a period greater than 12 months. The loan may also become due and payable if the borrower fails to pay property taxes, homeowners insurance, lets the condition of the home significantly deteriorate, or transfers the title of the property to a non-borrower (excluding trusts that meet HUD's requirements).

Once the mortgage comes due, borrowers or heirs of the estate have several options to settle up the loan balance:
 Pay off or refinance the existing balance to keep the home.
 Sell the home themselves to settle up the loan balance (and keep the remaining equity).
 Allow the lender to sell the home (and the remaining equity is distributed to the borrowers or heirs).
The HECM reverse mortgage is a non-recourse loan, which means that the only asset that can be claimed to repay the loan is the home itself. If there's not enough value in the home to settle up the loan balance, the FHA mortgage insurance fund covers the difference.
The heirs can purchase the home and pay off the loan with another source of funds. Heirs can purchase the property for the outstanding loan balance, or for 95 percent of the home's appraised value, whichever is less.Will my children be able to buy or keep my home after I'm gone?

Volume of loans 
Home Equity Conversion Mortgages account for 90% of all reverse mortgages originated in the U.S. As of May 2010, there were 493,815 active HECM loans. As of 2006, the number of HECM mortgages that HUD is authorized to insure under the reverse mortgage law was capped at 275,000. However, through the annual appropriations acts, Congress has temporarily extended HUD's authority to insure HECM's notwithstanding the statutory limits.

Program growth in recent years has been very rapid. In fiscal year 2001, 7,781 HECM loans were originated. By the fiscal year ending in September 2008, the annual volume of HECM loans topped 112,000 representing a 1,300% increase in six years. For the fiscal year ending September 2011, loan volume had contracted in the wake of the financial crisis, but remained at over 73,000 loans that were originated and insured through the HECM program.

Since the HECM program was created analysts have expected loan volume to grow further as the U.S. population ages. In 2000, the Census Bureau estimated that 34 million of the country's 270 million residents were sixty-five years of age or older, while projecting the two totals to rise to 62 and 337 million, respectively, in 2025.  In addition, The Center For Retirement Research at Boston College estimates that more than half of retirees “may be unable to maintain their standard of living in retirement.”.  The low adoption rates can be partially explained by dysfunctional aspects of the reverse mortgage market, including high markups, complexity of the product, consumer distrust of reverse mortgage lenders, and lack of pricing transparency.

Hong Kong
Hong Kong Mortgage Corporation (HKMC), a government sponsored entity similar to that of Fannie Mae and Freddie Mac in the US, provides credit enhancement service to commercial banks that originate reverse mortgage. Besides providing liquidity to the banks by securitization, HKMC can offer guarantee of reverse mortgage principals up to a certain percentage of the loan value. As of 2016, reverse mortgage is available to house-owners aged 55 or above from 10 different banks. Applicants can also boost the loan value by pledging their in-the-money life insurance policies to the bank. In terms of the use of proceed, applicants are allowed to make one-off withdrawal to pay for property maintenance, medical and legal costs, in addition to the monthly payout.

Taiwan
A trial program for  reverse mortgages was launched in 2013 by the Financial Supervisory Commission, Ministry of the Interior. Taiwan Cooperative Bank was the first bank to offer such a product. As of June 2017, reverse mortgages are available from a total of 10 financial institutions. However, social stigma associated with not preserving real estate for inheritance has prevented reverse mortgages from widespread adoption.

Criticism
Reverse mortgages have been criticized for several major shortcomings:
Possible high up-front costs make reverse mortgages expensive. In the United States, entering into a reverse mortgage will cost approximately the same as a traditional FHA mortgage, depending on the loan-to-value ratio.
 The interest rate on a reverse mortgage may be higher than on a conventional "forward mortgage".
 Interest compounds over the life of a reverse mortgage, which means that "the mortgage can quickly balloon". Since no monthly payments are made by the borrower on a reverse mortgage, the interest that accrues is treated as a loan advance. Each month, interest is calculated not only on the principal amount received by the borrower, but on the interest previously assessed to the loan.  Because of this compound interest, as a reverse mortgage's length grows, it becomes more likely to deplete the entire equity of the property. However, with an FHA-insured HECM reverse mortgage obtained in the United States or any reverse mortgage obtained in Canada, the borrower can never owe more than the value of the property and cannot pass on any debt from the reverse mortgage to any heirs. The sole remedy the lender has is the collateral, not assets in the estate, if applicable.
 Reverse mortgages can be confusing; many obtain them without fully understanding the terms and conditions, and it has been suggested in a 2012 U.S. that some lenders have sought to take advantage of this complexity to offer contracts that disadvantage homeowners. A majority of respondents to a 2000 survey of elderly Americans failed to understand the financial terms of reverse mortgages very well when securing their reverse mortgages.  "In the past, government investigations and consumer advocacy groups raised significant consumer protection concerns about the business practices of reverse mortgage lenders and other companies in the reverse mortgage industry" But in a 2006 survey of borrowers by AARP, ninety-three percent said their reverse mortgage had a mostly positive effect on their lives, compared with three percent who said the effect was mostly negative. Some ninety-three percent of borrowers reported that they were satisfied with their experiences with lenders, and ninety-five percent reported that they were satisfied with the counselors that they were required to see.

See also 
 Compare reverse mortgage with home equity loan and home equity line of credit.
 Elder financial abuse
 Negative amortization
 Bankruptcy
 Equity release, the United Kingdom equivalent
 Yung-Ping Chen#Home-equity conversion (reverse mortgage)
 Life estate

References

External links 
 

Mortgage
Old age